Thomas Kelati (born September 27, 1982) is an American professional basketball player of Eritrean heritage. In 2010, he gained Polish citizenship through his wife and is eligible to play on the Poland national basketball team in international competition. He is a 1.96 meters (6 ft 5 in) tall and plays both shooting guard and small forward.

Professional career

Kelati began his professional career in 2005 with the Belgian League club Dexia Mons-Hainaut. He then moved to the Polish League team Turów Zgorzelec in 2006 (two runners-up in Polish league, reached the final round in the ULEB Eurocup). In 2008, he joined the Spanish ACB League club Unicaja Málaga.

In July 2009, Kelati signed a two-year contract with the Greek A1 League club Olympiacos Piraeus. However, his contract was later canceled by the club before Kelati played even a single minute for them, due to him not passing his physical and medical exams. Olympiacos replaced him on their roster with Von Wafer.

As a free agent, Kelati then signed with the Los Angeles Lakers as a training camp invitee on September 30, 2009, but was later waived. Then he played for Power Electronics Valencia for whom he signed after being waived from the Los Angeles Lakers. In 2010, he won the ULEB Eurocup playing for the Power Electronics Valencia. On July 23, 2010, he signed a two-year deal with BC Khimki. With BC Khimki he won VTB United League in 2011 and Eurocup in 2012. In May, 2012 he left BC Khimki because of his contract ending.

In June 2012 he signed a two-year contract with Valencia Basket. He left Valencia in June 2013. On September 29, 2013, he signed a two-month contract with Laboral Kutxa. After the contract expired he left the team.

In February 2014, he signed with UCAM Murcia for the rest of the season. In July 2014, he extended his contract with Murcia for two more years.

On August 8, 2016, Kelati signed with Stelmet Zielona Góra.

Honours

Individual
Turów Zgorzelec
PLK Most Valuable Player (1): 2006–07

References

External links
ACB.com profile
Euroleague.net profile
Draftexpress.com profile
FIBA.com profile
Washington State Cougars profile

1982 births
Living people
American emigrants to Poland
American expatriate basketball people in Belgium
American expatriate basketball people in Poland 
American expatriate basketball people in Russia
American expatriate basketball people in Spain
American people of Eritrean descent
American men's basketball players
Naturalized citizens of Poland
Baloncesto Málaga players
Basket Zielona Góra players
Basketball players from Washington (state)
Belfius Mons-Hainaut players
BC Khimki players
CB Murcia players
Liga ACB players
Polish men's basketball players
Saski Baskonia players
Shooting guards
Small forwards
Sportspeople from Walla Walla, Washington
Turów Zgorzelec players
Valencia Basket players
Washington State Cougars men's basketball players